Statistics of Allsvenskan in season 1985.

Overview
The league was contested by 12 teams, with Malmö FF winning the league and Örgryte IS winning the Swedish championship after the play-offs.

League table

Results

Allsvenskan play-offs
The 1985 Allsvenskan play-offs was the fourth edition of the competition. The four best placed teams from Allsvenskan qualified to the competition. Örgryte who placed third in the league  won the competition and the Swedish championship after defeating IFK Göteborg who finished fourth in the league.

Semi-finals

First leg

Second leg

Final

Season statistics

Top scorers

Footnotes

References 

Allsvenskan seasons
Swed
Swed
1